Wana Tehsil is a subdivision located in South Waziristan District, Khyber Pakhtunkhwa, Pakistan. The population is  152,881 according to the 2017 census.

Notable people 
 Ali Wazir
 Arif Wazir
 Alamgir Wazir

See also 
 Wana
 List of tehsils of Khyber Pakhtunkhwa

References 

Tehsils of Khyber Pakhtunkhwa
Populated places in South Waziristan